HMS LST-402/LSE-53 was a United States Navy  that was transferred to the Royal Navy during World War II. As with many of her class, the ship was never named. Instead, she was referred to by her hull designation.

Construction
LST-402 was laid down on 21 August 1942, under Maritime Commission (MARCOM) contract, MC hull 922, by the Bethlehem-Fairfield Shipyard, Baltimore, Maryland; launched 9 October 1942; then transferred to the United Kingdom and commissioned on 9 December 1942.

Service history 
LST-402 was active in the Mediterranean during the Invasion of Sicily, the Salerno landings, and the Anzio landing. She later took part in the Normandy landings in the English Channel.

LST-402 was converted to LSE-53 for the 65th Maintenance Mobile Unit at the Wallsend-on-Tyne slipway.

In the summer of 1945, she was assigned to service in the Far East.

LST-402 saw no active service in the United States Navy. The tank landing ship was decommissioned and returned to United States Navy custody on 24 September 1946, and struck from the Navy list on 10 June 1947. She was subsequently sold for scrap, and dismantled in Gibraltar.

See also 
 List of United States Navy LSTs

Notes 

Citations

Bibliography 

Online resources

External links

 

Ships built in Baltimore
1942 ships
LST-1-class tank landing ships of the Royal Navy
World War II amphibious warfare vessels of the United Kingdom
S3-M2-K2 ships